Milenko Tepić (born February 27, 1987) is a Serbian professional basketball executive and former player. He is 2.02 m (6 ft 7.5 in) tall, and a combo guard-point forward.

Professional career
Tepić began his career playing with the KK Sports World youth teams in Serbia. He made his professional debut with the NIS Vojvodina in 2002.

In July 2006, Tepić signed with the Serbian Euroleague club Partizan. Tepić has won three Serbian League and Adriatic League titles with Partizan. He also lifted the Serbian Cup trophy in 2008 and 2009. In his last season with Partizan he averaged 9.8 points, 3.5 rebounds and 3.4 assists in 18 Euroleague games, helping his team reach the Quarterfinal Playoffs for the second time in a row.

In June 2009, Tepić signed a three-year contract with the Greek Basket League club Panathinaikos. He played two seasons with the Greek club and won the EuroLeague in 2011, as well as two Greek League championships in 2010 and 2011.

On 26 September 2011, he signed a two-year contract with the Spanish club Cajasol Sevilla. On July 25, 2013, he signed a one-year deal with Lietuvos rytas.

In December 2013, he returned to his former club Partizan, signing a contract until the end of the 2014–15 season. He won the Serbian League championship in 2014.

On September 3, 2015, Tepić signed with Greek club PAOK for the 2015–16 season.

On November 13, 2016, he signed with Italian club Orlandina Basket for the rest of the 2016–17 LBA season.

On July 22, 2017, Tepić signed with Italian club New Basket Brindisi for the 2017–18 LBA season.

On July 21, 2019, he signed with Pallacanestro Varese of the Italian LBA but the contract was terminated on November.

On November 14, 2019, Tepić joined his third team in the Greek League, Iraklis Thessaloniki.  He averaged 4.7 points, 4.7 rebounds and 1.9 assists per game. On August 10, 2020, he signed with Mega Basket. On 15 July 2021, he announced his retirement from his basketball career at age 34, becoming the team manager for Mega Basket.

National team career
Tepić won a gold medal at both the 2003 FIBA Europe Under-16 Championship and the 2005 FIBA Europe Under-18 Championship. He also won a gold medal at both the 2006 and 2007 FIBA Europe Under-20 Championships.

He has also been a member of the senior men's Serbian national basketball team, and with the senior team of Serbia, he played at the EuroBasket 2007. At the EuroBasket 2009, he won a silver medal with Serbia. He also played at the 2010 FIBA World Championship and the EuroBasket 2011.

Career statistics

Euroleague

|-
| style="text-align:left;"| 2006–07
| style="text-align:left;"| Partizan
| 20 || 6 || 19.7 || .337 || .281 || .698 || 2.1 || 1.4 || 1.3 || .0 || 4.8 || 4.3
|-
| style="text-align:left;"| 2007–08
| style="text-align:left;"| Partizan
| 23 || 14 || 26.5 || .439 || .389 || .783 || 3.4 || 2.2 || .8 || .1 || 9.0 || 8.1 
|-
| style="text-align:left;"| 2008–09
| style="text-align:left;"| Partizan
| 19 || 18 || 30.5 || .389 || .397 || .673 || 3.5 || 3.3 || .8 || .2 || 9.7 || 10.5 
|-
| style="text-align:left;"| 2009–10
| style="text-align:left;"| Panathinaikos
| 15 || 2 || 15.8 || .364 || .217 || .778 || 2.1 || 1.0 || .4 || .0 || 3.5 || 2.3
|-
| style="text-align:left;background:#AFE6BA;"| 2010–11†
| style="text-align:left;"| Panathinaikos
| 19 || 2 || 9.6 || .321 || .143 || .706 || 1.1 || .7 || .3 || .0 || 2.5 || 1.7
|-
| style="text-align:left;"| 2013–14
| style="text-align:left;"| Lietuvos rytas
| 9 || 1 || 15.8 || .348 || .222 || 1.000 || 1.6 || 1.4 || .5 || .0 || 4.2 || 3.2
|-
| style="text-align:left;"| 2013–14
| style="text-align:left;"| Partizan
| 13 || 10 || 29.6 || .427 || .320 || .889 || 2.5 || 2.0 || .8 || .0 || 6.2 || 5.0
|- class="sortbottom"
| style="text-align:left;"| Career
| style="text-align:left;"|
| 118 || 53 || 20.5 || .388 || .331 || .731 || 2.4 || 1.7 || .7 || .1 || 6.0 || 5.4

Post-playing career 
On 15 July 2021, on the same day of the retirement of his playing career, Mega Basket named Tepić their new team manager. He left after only one season, in July 2022.

References

External links

 Milenko Tepić at aba-liga.com
 Milenko Tepić at acb.com 
 Milenko Tepić at draftexpress.com
 Milenko Tepić at esake.gr 
 Milenko Tepić at euroleague.net
 Milenko Tepić at fiba.com
 Milenko Tepić at legabasket.it 

1987 births
Living people
2010 FIBA World Championship players
ABA League players
Basketball League of Serbia players
BC Rytas players
Real Betis Baloncesto players
Greek Basket League players
Iraklis Thessaloniki B.C. players
KK Mega Basket players
KK Partizan players
KK Vojvodina Srbijagas players
Lega Basket Serie A players
Liga ACB players
New Basket Brindisi players
Orlandina Basket players
Pallacanestro Varese players
Panathinaikos B.C. players
P.A.O.K. BC players
Point guards
Serbian basketball executives and administrators
Serbian expatriate basketball people in Greece
Serbian expatriate basketball people in Italy
Serbian expatriate basketball people in Lithuania
Serbian expatriate basketball people in Spain
Serbian men's basketball players
Serbia men's national basketball team players
Shooting guards
Small forwards
Basketball players from Novi Sad
Universiade medalists in basketball
Universiade bronze medalists for Serbia and Montenegro
Medalists at the 2005 Summer Universiade